Melville Reuben Bissell  (September 25, 1843 – March 15, 1889) was an American entrepreneur who invented the modern carpet sweeper. The Bissell corporation is named after him.

Life and career
Bissell was born in Hartwick, New York, and grew up in Berlin, Wisconsin. As a young adult, he opened a grocery store in 1862 with his father, Alpheus, in Kalamazoo, Michigan, selling it in 1869 and opening a crockery and glassware store in Grand Rapids, Michigan, in 1870. He made money manufacturing crockery and investing in real estate.

Following the financial Panic of 1873 and the following economic depression, Bissell began working on a carpet sweeper. In 1876 Bissell patented a sweeper with a central brush, rubber wheels, and other improvements over previous sweepers. A fire in 1884 destroyed his first factory, but he was able to overcome the loss and still later expand his business.

Following his death from pneumonia in 1889 in Grand Rapids, his wife, Anna Bissell, took control of the company, becoming America's first female corporate chief executive officer.

References

External links

Our History via Bissell

1843 births
1889 deaths
American manufacturing businesspeople
People from Hartwick, New York
19th-century American businesspeople
Engineers from New York (state)